Me, Natalie is a 1969 American comedy-drama film directed by Fred Coe about a homely young woman from Brooklyn who moves to Greenwich Village and finds romance with an aspiring painter. The screenplay by A. Martin Zweiback is based on an original story by Stanley Shapiro. Patty Duke, who starred in the title role, won a Golden Globe Award for her performance. The film also starred James Farentino, Salome Jens, Elsa Lanchester, Martin Balsam and Nancy Marchand. It marked Al Pacino's film debut.

Plot 
From childhood, Brooklyn teenager Natalie Miller, who has upper front teeth that are slightly bucked, and a nose too large for her face, has considered herself to be homely, and has never subscribed to her mother's determined belief that she will grow up to be pretty. By contrast, her best friend, Betty, is a popular and beautiful blonde cheerleader who has been going steady with the handsome Stanley since junior high school. Natalie's efforts to become  a cheerleader herself, impress a blind date, and attend her graduation dance all fail. She is briefly cheered up by her beloved Uncle Harold, who tells her that someday a man will look beyond her face, and see her good inner qualities, but she becomes disillusioned after Harold gets engaged to a sexy, voluptuous go-go dancer, Shirley. Believing that Harold chose Shirley based on her looks, Natalie regards Shirley with contempt, and when Harold dies suddenly, avoids attending his funeral.

A year later, Natalie encounters Shirley, who has turned to drugs in her grief over Harold. Natalie sees that Shirley and Harold really did love each other, and that Shirley's physical attractiveness has not brought her happiness. Natalie's parents worry because she has been expelled from college, has not found a job, and has no boyfriends or marital prospects. They try to arrange dates for her, and her father attempts to bribe Morris, an unattractive aspiring optometrist, to marry her. After learning of the bribery scheme, an incensed Natalie moves out of her parents' apartment, planning to move in with Shirley in Manhattan.

Upon arriving at Shirley's bohemian apartment building in Greenwich Village, Natalie finds that Shirley has committed suicide. Natalie rents and fixes up Shirley's vacant apartment, and gets a cocktail waitress job at the "Topless Bottomless Club". Natalie is attracted to her downstairs neighbor, David Harris, an architect, who has left his job for three months to pursue his dream of becoming a painter. Having dismissed David as a "sex pervert" because he is usually painting beautiful nude female models, she is taken aback when David finds her face "interesting" and asks her to model for him. Their friendship gradually grows into a romance, with Natalie encouraging his painting aspirations and David building her self-confidence. However, just after Natalie sees her old friend, Betty, make an unhappy marriage due to an out-of-wedlock pregnancy, Natalie discovers David is actually married to a wealthy, beautiful woman and has two young sons.

After a confrontation, David reassures Natalie that he really loves her and he will go back to his family home, end his marriage, and return to her. At first Natalie waits eagerly in his apartment for his return, but as time goes by she feels guilty about separating him from his family. Finally she writes David a farewell letter, saying she will always love him but expressing the wish to take responsibility for her own happiness, and leaves.

Cast 

 Patty Duke as Natalie Miller
 James Farentino as David Harris
 Salome Jens as Shirley Norton
 Elsa Lanchester as Miss Dennison
 Martin Balsam as Harold Miller
 Nancy Marchand as Edna Miller
 Philip Sterling as Sidney Miller
 Deborah Winters as Betty Simon
 Ron Hale as Stanley Dexter
 Bob Balaban as Morris
 Al Pacino as Tony
 Catherine Burns as Hester
 Ann Thomas as Mrs. Schroder
 Matthew Cowles as Harvey Belman
 Milt Kamen as Plastic Surgeon
 Robert Frink as Freddie
 Dennis Allen as Max
 Robyn Morgan as Natalie Miller (age 7)

Production 
Works by Nathan Wasserberger were used in the film as the paintings produced by the character David Harris.

Critical reception 
In his review in The New York Times, Vincent Canby called the film "an artificial mess of wisecracks and sentimentality" and added, "Locales and a gummy musical score by Henry Mancini and Rod McKuen are among the things constantly impinging on Me, Natalie. Another is Coe's apparent indecision as to whether the movie is a character study or a gag comedy. Mostly it's just gags, delivered abrasively by Miss Duke, who is even less effective when registering pathos."

Roger Ebert of the Chicago Sun-Times found it to be "as conventional and corny as warmed-over "Young at Heart" . . . a pleasant film, very funny at times . . . Patty Duke, as Natalie, supplies a wonderful performance."

TV Guide considers the film "somewhat bland" but calls Duke "a wonder" and adds, "Handled by a lesser actress, the results might have seemed more stereotypical, but Duke is convincing."

Awards and nominations 
 Golden Globe Award for Best Actress - Motion Picture Musical or Comedy (Patty Duke, winner)
 Grammy Award for Best Original Score Written for a Motion Picture or Television Show (nominee)
 Writers Guild of America Award for Best Drama Written Directly for the Screen (nominee)

See also 
 List of American films of 1969

References

External links 
 
 
 

1969 films
1960s coming-of-age comedy-drama films
1960s romantic comedy-drama films
American coming-of-age comedy-drama films
American romantic comedy-drama films
Cinema Center Films films
Films directed by Fred Coe
Films featuring a Best Musical or Comedy Actress Golden Globe winning performance
Films scored by Henry Mancini
Films set in New York City
Films shot in New York City
1969 comedy films
1969 drama films
1960s English-language films
1960s American films